KZNO-LD, virtual channel 12 (VHF digital channel 6), is a low-power Jewelry Television–affiliated station licensed to Big Bear Lake, California, United States. Owned by the Venture Technologies Group, it transmits from Mount Harvard, a peak adjacent to Mount Wilson in Los Angeles County, as a Spanish-language religious radio station that can be received at 87.7 FM. Its ATSC 3.0 video feed broadcasts Jewelry TV on digital channel 6.1.

History
The station was founded on August 7, 1996, as translator K06MU. It was also available to area subscribers of Charter Cable on channel 6. The station's programming at the time was similar to a public-access television cable television channel, consisting primarily of news, public affairs and travel programs produced by local residents of the Big Bear Valley.

In 2016, ownership was transferred from Bear Valley Broadcasting to Venture Technologies, which previously owned KSFV-CA, which also operated on analog channel 6 as a radio station, which, as KSFV-CD, now shares transmitting facilities on Box Springs Mountain in Riverside County with Ontario-licensed KPOM-CD.

While operating as an analog TV station, KZNO-LP audio could be heard locally by radio receivers at 87.7 FM, since TV channel 6 is in the 82–88 MHz range. Because it was a low-power station, it was not required to switch to a digital signal on June 12, 2009, which was required of all full-power TV stations in the United States.

As of July 9, 2021, KZNO-LP had ceased its analog TV transmissions, prior to the July 13, 2021, FCC deadline for LPTV stations to end analog TV transmissions. The station was licensed for digital operation effective July 15, 2021, changing its call sign to KZNO-LD at the same time. Effective July 27, 2021, the station was granted a six-month special temporary authority to resume audio transmissions receivable at 87.7 FM.

References

External links

Big Bear Valley
Mass media in San Bernardino County, California
Television channels and stations established in 1996
1996 establishments in California
ZNO-LD
Low-power television stations in the United States
ATSC 3.0 television stations